Blood, Guts, Bullets, and Octane is a 1998 American independent action comedy film written, produced, edited, directed and starring Joe Carnahan in his feature-length directorial debut.

For years the film was under negotiation for development as a prime time series on NBC by Carnahan and producer Bob Levy.  However, the series has not materialized, even after 23 years.

Premise
The film stars Carnahan and the film's other producer Dan Leis as two salesmen of a failing used car dealership who are paid $250,000 to allow a 1963 Pontiac LeMans convertible onto the dealership lot for two days.

References

External links

Ziggy's Video Realm: Blood, Guts, Bullets, and Octane
Interview with Joe Carnahan by Jordon Hoffman

1998 films
American independent films
American black comedy films
American action comedy films
1998 action comedy films
Lionsgate films
Films directed by Joe Carnahan
Films with screenplays by Joe Carnahan
Films produced by Joe Carnahan
1998 directorial debut films
1990s English-language films
1990s American films